Braves of Customs, also known as simply Customs, is a Ghanaian  basketball club based in Accra. The team plays in the Accra Basketball League (ABL). It is the basketball team of the Customs Excise and Preventive Service (CEPS), Ghana's customs organization.

Established in 2018, the team won the ABL championship in 2018 and 2019. In October 2019, Braves played in the qualifying tournaments for the Basketball Africa League.

Honours
Accra Basketball League
Winners (1): 2018, 2019

In African competitions
BAL Qualifiers (1 appearance)
2020 – First Round

References

External links
GRA Customs at Afrobasket

Basketball teams in Ghana
Basketball teams established in 2018
Sport in Accra
Road to BAL teams